Studencheskaya is a Moscow Metro station in the Dorogomilovo District, Moscow, Russia. It is on the Filyovskaya Line, between Kutuzovskaya and Kiyevskaya stations.

Studencheskaya is located to the West of the Kiyevsky railway station, sandwiched between the railroad tracks and Kievskaya street. While the station is surface level, it sits in a deeper cut than normal, so that the platforms are a full story below ground level. This puts the overhead vestibule level with the street, which unusually runs parallel to the station rather than over it. Opened on 7 November 1958, Studencheskaya features unusual side platforms like its contemporaries Fili and Kutuzovskaya. The architects of all the three stations were Rimidalv Pogrebnoy and Yuriy Zenkevich.

External links
metro.ru
mymetro.ru
KartaMetro.info – Station location and exits on Moscow map (English/Russian)

Moscow Metro stations
Railway stations in Russia opened in 1958
Filyovskaya Line